TeachStreet, Inc. was a web site providing information to students on local and online classes and teachers including pricing information, location, and teacher background and training. It also provided online business management tools for teachers and schools. The site was free to students and included student reviews and teacher recommendations.

History
TeachStreet launched its web site in Seattle on April 20, 2008, Portland on August 4, 2008, the San Francisco Bay Area on November 19, 2008 and was launched in 8 US Metros, with new listings being added in cities nationwide on a daily basis.

TeachStreet founder Dave Schappell was previously a VP of Marketing at JibJab and a Director of Product Management at Amazon.com.  The company received $2.25 million in early stage funding from Madrona Venture Group, Bezos Expeditions and various individual investors. Initially, the Teachstreet web site was free to both students and teachers. The site moved to a paying service for teachers' listings in April 2010, with various levels of pricing plans available. However, the site remained free for students.

In February 2011, the launch of Google Panda (a change to Google's search results ranking algorithm) seriously affected traffic to the company's web site, and it never fully recovered. A year later, Teachstreet was bought by Amazon.com as a "talent acquisition" with its former employees transferring to AmazonLocal. Teachstreet.com closed down on 15 February 2012.

References

Press coverage
 Teachstreet lets you find instructors online. VentureBeat.
 Web Site Links you with Learning. King5.
 Ex-Amazonian's TeachStreet.com launching today. Seattle Times
 TeachStreet site provides free way to find instructors. Seattle Post-Intelligencer
 Teachstreet helps you find local classes, instructors. The Industry Standard
 TeachStreet founder applies lessons learned from years at Amazon. TheDeal.com
 Website Rates Thousands of Classes. KGO-TV San Francisco

External links
 TeachStreet web site as of 10 July 2011 via the Wayback Machine internet archive
 TeachStreet blog as of 16 July 2011 via the Wayback Machine internet archive 
 5 Tips To Transition From A Free To A Paid Service by Dave Schappell, Founder and CEO of TeachStreet, on techcrunch.com (13 June 2010)

Companies based in Seattle
Defunct online companies of the United States
Privately held companies based in Washington (state)
American companies established in 2007
Companies disestablished in 2012
Amazon (company) acquisitions
Technology companies established in 2007
Education companies established in 2007